The Stu Sells Toronto Tankard is an annual bonspiel, or curling tournament, that takes place at the High Park Club in Toronto, Ontario. The men's tournament, started in 2010, is held in a triple-knockout format, while the women's tournament, originally had a round-robin format, but became a triple knock out in 2021. The tournament is sponsored by Stu Sells, a local real estate company, and is part of the "Stu Sells Series" or events, which includes the Stu Sells Oakville Tankard, the Stu Sells 1824 Halifax Classic, and a number of other junior and local tour events. The men's event became a World Curling Tour event in 2011, but was later discontinued after the 2019 edition. The women's event became a World Curling Tour event in 2016, but was also discontinued in 2020. Both the men's and women's events are also part of the Ontario Curling Tour.

The 2020 event was held at the KW Granite Club in Waterloo, Ontario, as the High Park Club had yet to open for the season due to the COVID-19 pandemic in Toronto.

Past champions

Men

Women

References

External links
Event Site

Ontario Curling Tour events
Curling in Toronto
Former World Curling Tour events